Lorraine Bénic (born July 27, 1937) is a Canadian painter, sculptor and printmaker.

Career 
Bénic was born in Montreal. She studied at the Ecole des Beaux-Arts (1958-1962) and engraving in Paris (1963-1965). Following her studies, she taught engraving in Fontainebleau, Paris, Nice, and Saint-Paul-de-Vence (1965-19 1). She
has received scholarships from the Quebec Ministry of Cultural Affairs and was also awarded an etching prize from Loto�Quebec in 1987.

Her work is included in the collections of the Musée national des beaux-arts du Québec and  the Musée d'Art Moderne de Paris

References

1937 births
20th-century Canadian women artists
21st-century Canadian women artists
Living people
Artists from Montreal